The Blue Rose of Texas is the fourth studio album by American country music artist Holly Dunn, and the first with the Warner Bros. Records label. A single from this album, "Are You Ever Gonna Love Me", was her first number 1 Billboard country single. Another major hit from the album was the fourth track, "There Goes My Heart Again". Dolly Parton provides supporting vocals on her own "Most of All, Why" and Joe Diffie provides backing vocals on "There Goes My Heart Again" a song he had a part in writing. Dunn co-produced the album with her brother, Chris Waters.

Track listing

Personnel
Compiled from the liner notes.

Musicians
 Eddie Bayers – drums
 Mark Casstevens – acoustic guitar, mandolin, harmonica
 Holly Dunn – lead vocals
 Paul Franklin – pedal steel guitar, lap steel guitar, Dobro, Pedabro
 Steve Gibson – electric guitar, acoustic guitar, mandolin
 Rob Hajacos – fiddle
 Roy Huskey, Jr. – upright bass
 Chris Leuzinger – acoustic guitar, electric guitar
 Farrell Morris – marimba
 Phil Naish – keyboards
 Glenn Worf – bass guitar

Background vocalists
 Joe Diffie, Holly Dunn, Dolly Parton, Lee Satterfield, Chris Waters, Dennis Wilson, Curtis Young, Liana Young

Technical
 Holly Dunn – production
 Mike Psanos – engineering, mixing
 Chris Waters – production
 Hank Williams – mastering

Chart performance

References

Holly Dunn albums
Warner Records albums
1989 albums